The Taff Vale Railway O3 class was a class of two 0-6-2T steam tank locomotives designed by Tom Hurry Riches, built by Kitson & Co. and introduced to the Taff Vale Railway in 1904.  They were rebuilt with new boilers by the Great Western Railway (GWR) in 1930.

Numbering

Withdrawal and disposal
Both entered British Railways service in 1948, but neither lasted more than 3 months before being retired and scrapped. Both were withdrawn from the Cardiff Canton shed.

See also
 Welsh 0-6-2T locomotives
 Locomotives of the Great Western Railway

External links
 Rail UK database entry for Taff Vale Railway O3 class

O3
0-6-2T locomotives
Railway locomotives introduced in 1904
Kitson locomotives
Standard gauge steam locomotives of Great Britain
Scrapped locomotives